Quaqtaq is a northern village (Inuit community) in Nunavik, northern Quebec, Canada.  Its population was 453 in the Canada 2021 Census.

The village is one of the northernmost inhabited places in Quebec, located on the eastern shore of Diana Bay (Tuvaaluk in the Inuktitut language), on a peninsula which protrudes into the Hudson Strait where it meets Ungava Bay.

The name Quaqtaq signifies tapeworm. According to local folklore, this name derives from a man who once came to the area to hunt beluga and found live parasites in his feces. His hunting companions began to call the place Quaqtaq.

Inaccessible by road, Quaqtaq is served by the small Quaqtaq Airport.

History
Archaeological evidence indicates that people have occupied the area around Quaqtaq for about 3500 years. Thule people, the ancestors of today's Inuit, arrived around 1400 or 1500 AD.

In 1947, a Roman Catholic mission opened in Quaqtaq. The present-day settlement was established after a trading post first established in 1927 at Iggiajaaq, a few kilometres south-west, was finally closed in 1950. After a measles epidemic killed 11 adults in 1952, the Canadian government began delivering basic services to the community. A nursing station was built in 1963. In the 1960s, the Quebec government opened a store and a post office equipped with a radio-telephone. In 1974, the store became a co-operative and, in 1978, Quaqtaq was legally established as a Northern village.

Since 1996, policing is provided by the Kativik Regional Police Force.

Demographics 

Population trend:
 Population in 2021: 453 (2016 to 2021 population change: 12.4%)
 Population in 2016: 403
 Population in 2011: 376
 Population in 2006: 315
 Population in 2001: 305
 Population in 1996: 257
 Population in 1981: 150

Private dwellings occupied by usual residents: 144 (total dwellings: 173)

Education
The Kativik School Board operates the Isummasaqvik School.

People
Notable people from the community include musicians Beatrice Deer and Jaaji Uppik.

References

External links
Website of the village of Quaqtaq

Inuit communities in Quebec
Road-inaccessible communities of Quebec